The Royal Swedish Academy of War Sciences is one of the Royal Academies in Sweden and was founded on 12 November 1796 by Gustaf Wilhelm af Tibell. The academy is an independent organization and a forum for military (army and air force) and defense studies as well as national security issues. Membership is limited to 160 chairs under the age of 62.

Presidents

1799–1800: Per Ulrik Lilliehorn
????–????: ?
1805–1806: Salomon von Rajalin

1815–????: Anders Fredrik Skjöldebrand
????–????: ?
1904–1906: Richard Berg
????–????: ?
????–????: Gustaf Uggla
????–????: Herman Wrangel
1922–1923: Hugo Jungstedt
????–????: Gustaf Dyrssen
1927–1929: Henning von Krusenstierna
1929–1931: Bror Munck
1931–1933: Carl Gustaf Hammarskjöld
1933–1935: Carl Fredrik Riben
1935–1937: Ludvig Hammarskiöld
1937–1939: Oscar Nygren
1939–1941: Otto Lybeck
1941–1943: Lennart Lilliehöök
1943–1945: Erik Testrup
1945–1947: Archibald Douglas
1948–1949: Bengt Nordenskiöld
1949–1951: Helge Strömbäck
1951–1953: Birger Hedqvist
1953–1955: Stig H:son Ericson
1955–1957: Axel Ljungdahl
1957–1959: Ivar Gewert
1959–1961: Erik Samuelson
1961–1963: Rudolf Kolmodin
1963–1965: Bert Carpelan
1965–1967: Lage Thunberg
1967–1969: Åke Lindemalm
1969–1971: Carl Eric Almgren
1971–1973: Stig Norén
1973–1975: Bengt Lundvall
1975–1977: Ove Ljung
1977–1979: Dick Stenberg
1979–1982: Gunnar Thyresson
1982–1985: Gunnar Eklund
1985–1988: Per Sköld
1988–1991: Sven-Olof Olson
1991–1996: Carl-Olof Ternryd
1996–1999: Peter Nordbeck
1999–2002: Jörn Beckmann
2002–2006: Erik Norberg
2007–2010: Bo Huldt
2010–2014: Frank Rosenius
2014–2018: Mikael Odenberg
2018–2022: Sverker Göranson
2022–present: Björn von Sydow

Notable members 
 Karl Amundson
 Magnus Ranstorp
 Mertil Melin
  Michael Moore
 Frederik Due (honorary member)
 Anders Tegnell

See also 

Society and Defense
Swedish Army
Swedish Air Force

External links 
Royal Swedish Academy of War Sciences – Official site

1796 establishments in Sweden
War Sciences
Military of Sweden
Scientific organizations established in 1796
Think tanks based in Sweden
Military-related organizations